HSwMS Uttern (Ut), (Swedish for "Otter") was the sixth Hajen-class submarine of the Swedish Navy.

Construction and career 
HSwMS Uttern was launched on 14 November 1958 by Saab Kockums, Karlskrona and commissioned on 15 March 1960.

She was decommissioned on 1 July 1980 and later sold for scrap in Odense in 1981.

Gallery

References 

Hajen-class submarines
Ships built in Malmö
1958 ships